Herman Eugene Talmadge (August 9, 1913 – March 21, 2002) was an American politician who served as governor of Georgia in 1947 and from 1948 to 1955 and as a U.S. Senator from Georgia from 1957 to 1981. Talmadge, a Democrat, served during a time of political transition, both in Georgia and nationally. Talmadge began his career as a staunch segregationist and was known for his opposition to civil rights, ordering schools to be closed rather than desegregated. By the later stages of his career, however, Talmadge had modified his earlier views. His life eventually encapsulated the emergence of his native Georgia from entrenched white supremacy into a political culture where white voters regularly elect black Congressmen.

When his father, Eugene Talmadge, won the 1946 Georgia gubernatorial election but died before taking office, Herman Talmadge asserted claims to be the 70th governor of Georgia, in what is known as the three governors controversy. Talmadge occupied the governor's office from January until March 1947, before yielding to a court decision in favor of Melvin E. Thompson, the elected lieutenant governor. In 1948, a special election was held to determine who would finish the rest of the term; Talmadge defeated Thompson by over 6%. He was re-elected to a full term in 1950 by defeating Thompson again in a closer race. Talmadge would then serve as governor until the end of his term in 1955.

Talmadge, who became governor as a political novice at just age 33, supported the passage of a statewide sales tax and the construction of new schools. He also supported infrastructure improvements and increased teachers' salaries. While he remains a controversial figure in Georgia history, especially due to his opposition to civil rights, some Georgians praised Talmadge for his infrastructure improvements brought about by the passage of the sales tax.

In the Senate, Talmadge was prominently a member of the Senate Agriculture Committee and later the Select Committee on Presidential Campaign Activities (better known as the Senate Watergate Committee). As chairman of the Agriculture Committee, Talmadge oversaw the passing of several major pieces of legislation, including the expansion of the Child Nutrition Act and the Consolidated Farm and Rural Development Act of 1972, the first major legislation dealing with rural development since the Rural Electrification Act of 1936. Talmadge was later denounced by the Senate for financial irregularities revealed during a bitter divorce from his second wife; this, along with Georgia's changing demographics, led to his defeat by Republican Mack Mattingly in his 1980 re-election campaign.

Early life, education and military service
Herman Talmadge was born on August 9, 1913, on a farm near the small town of McRae in Telfair County in the southeastern part of Georgia. He was the only son of Eugene Talmadge and his wife, Mattie (Thurmond) and through his mother, he was a second cousin of South Carolina Senator and 1948 Dixiecrat Presidential Candidate Strom Thurmond. Herman attended public schools in Telfair County until his senior year of high school when his family moved to Atlanta and he enrolled at Druid Hills High School, graduating in 1931. In the fall of 1931, he entered the University of Georgia for his undergraduate degree and was a member of the Demosthenian Literary Society and Sigma Nu fraternity. After completing his undergraduate studies, Talmadge enrolled in the University of Georgia School of Law. Talmadge received his law degree in 1936 and joined his father's law practice.

In 1937 he married his first wife, Katherine Williamson and the marriage ended in divorce after three years. In 1941 he married his second wife, Betty Shingler, and they had two sons, Herman Eugene Jr. and Robert Shingler.

When World War II broke out, Talmadge volunteered to serve in the United States Navy. Talmadge served as an ensign with the Sixth Naval District at Charleston, SC and with the Third Naval District in New York after graduating from midshipman's school at Northwestern University. Talmadge participated in the battle of Okinawa and he was present in Tokyo Bay for the Japanese surrender. He attained rank of lieutenant commander and was discharged in November 1945.

After his service in World War II, Talmadge returned to his home in Lovejoy, Georgia. While continuing to practice law and to farm, Talmadge took over publishing his father's weekly newspaper, The Statesman, and started a ham-curing business.

Three governors controversy

After returning from the war, Talmadge became active in Democratic Party politics. He ran his father's successful 1946 campaign for governor. Eugene Talmadge had been ill, and his supporters were worried about his surviving long enough to be sworn in. They studied the state constitution and found that if the governor-elect died before his term began, the Georgia General Assembly would choose between the second and third-place finishers for the successor. The elder Talmadge ran unopposed among Democrats, so the party officials arranged for write-in votes for Herman Talmadge as insurance.

In December 1946, the elder Talmadge died before taking office. Melvin E. Thompson, the lieutenant governor-elect; Ellis Arnall, the prior governor; and Herman Talmadge as write-in candidate, all arranged to be sworn in and were concurrently trying to conduct state business from the Georgia State Capitol. Arnall relinquished his claim in favor of Thompson. Ultimately, Thompson was supported by the Supreme Court of Georgia.

Career after 1946

Talmadge prepared to run for the special gubernatorial election in 1948, and defeated incumbent Governor Thompson. Two years later, Talmadge was elected to a full term in the 1950 election. During his terms, Talmadge attracted new industries to Georgia. He remained a staunch supporter of racial segregation, even as the Civil rights movement gained momentum in the postwar years.

Talmadge was barred by law from seeking another full term as governor in 1954. That year the United States Supreme Court ruled in Brown v. Board of Education that segregated public schools were unconstitutional, and advised school systems to integrate.

United States Senate career
As part of Talmadge's 1956 Senate campaign, he published the infamous segregationist pamphlet, “You and Segregation,” arguing that desegregation was a communist plot, that the use of federal power to forbid segregation was unconstitutional, and that, in the now-imfamous phrase, the United States was a "Republic not a Democracy," since democracy was communist.

Talmadge was elected to the United States Senate in 1956. Most Black people in Georgia were still disenfranchised under state laws passed by white Democrats and discriminatory practices they had conducted since the turn of the 20th century. During his time as U.S. Senator, Talmadge continued as a foe of civil rights legislation, even as the Civil rights movement gained media coverage and increasing support across the country. After President Lyndon B. Johnson signed the Civil Rights Act of 1964, Talmadge, along with more than a dozen other southern senators, boycotted the 1964 Democratic National Convention.

With the help of Senator Richard Russell, Talmadge had gained appointment to the Agriculture Committee during his first year in Washington and to the Senate Finance Committee shortly thereafter. As a junior member of the Agriculture Committee, Talmadge worked to address the constantly changing needs of the nation's farmers in an evolving global economy. Talmadge also worked to expand support for both farmers and children and families in hunger through his work on the passage Child Nutrition Act of 1966, but most significantly in 1969 and 1970 as part of the re-authorization and expansion of the 1946 School Lunch Act which Russell had authored and considered to be his greatest legislative achievement.

Talmadge was a great admirer of the work Russell had done on the 1946 act but recognized that significant improvements were needed. Talmadge, after noting that only one-third of American children living in families making less than $2000 a year were able to participate in the program said “We must use food as a tool of education. A child cannot learn if he is hungry. It has been the experience of school administrators in economically deprived areas that there is a marked improvement in school attendance when children can look forward to the prospect of a good meal at school.” Major goals of the new Talmadge proposal were in providing funding for equipment, increasing the required level of support from states, allowing the “lunch to follow the child”- allowing students from low income families that lived in higher income areas to remain eligible for the program, establishment of the  National Advisory Council on Child Nutrition, and special assistance for needy children. The amendments for these purposes became law on May 14, 1970.

When Sen. Allen Ellender of Louisiana assumed chairmanship of the Senate Appropriations Committee following Richard Russell's death in January 1971, Talmadge became chairman of the Senate Agriculture Committee, a position he held until leaving office in 1981.

Talmadge's elevation to Agriculture Committee Chairman came at a time when many analysts were forecasting that the world's need for food would soon outstrip its productive capacity. Under Talmadge's leadership, the Senate Agriculture Committee confronted these problems throughout the 1970s.  Talmadge oversaw the passage of several bills that more than doubled spending on farm programs by the end of the 1970s. In addition to the Rural Development Act of 1972, some of the other major bills passed under Talmadge's chairmanship included: The Agriculture and Consumer Protection Act of 1973 (also known as the 1973 U.S. Farm Bill) which provided for commodity price support, soil conservation, and food stamp expansion for four years. The four-year period established a cycle that ensured the next three farm bills appeared on the congressional agenda after presidential elections, and thereby preventing them from becoming entangled in election-year politics. The Food and Agriculture Act of 1977 continued the market-oriented loan and target-pricing policies of its predecessor.  Title XIV of the Act confirmed the USDA's historic role in agricultural research under the National Agricultural Research, Extension, and Teaching Policy Act.  The bill also made major modifications to food stamps and solidified the program as a part of the Farm Bill.

Additionally in 1977, as a result of Senate committee reorganization and in recognition of the Agriculture Committee's increased role in addressing hunger and nutrition, growing spending for federally-supported child nutrition (which rose from $2.4 billion to more than $8 billion during the decade), and increase of staff size (rising from seven in 1971 to 32 in 1980), the committee's name was changed to the Committee on Agriculture, Nutrition, and Forestry. This was the first change to the committee's name since adding “Forestry” in 1884.

In 1968, Talmadge faced the first of his three Republican challengers for his Senate seat. E. Earl Patton (1927–2011), later a member of the Georgia State Senate, received 256,796 votes (22.5 percent) to Talmadge's 885,103 (77.3 percent). Patton, a real estate developer, was the first Republican in Georgia to run for the U.S. Senate since the Reconstruction era, when most Republicans had been African-American freedmen. He was a sign of the shifting white electorate in the South, where white suburbanites moved into the Republican Party.

Talmadge ran a disciplined office, requiring his staff to respond to every constituent letter within 24 hours of receipt. In 1969, Talmadge hired Curtis Lee Atkinson onto his senate staff as an administrative aide, making Atkinson the first African-American hired to work on a Southern senator's personal staff since the Reconstruction Era.

In early 1973, Talmadge was appointed to the Select Committee on Presidential Campaign Activities (better known as the United States Senate Watergate Committee) which investigated the activities of members of the Nixon administration. He served on the committee until its final report was issued in June 1974. Talmadge's service on the committee is generally considered the high-water mark of his time as a U.S. Senator.

Denunciation
Late in his Senate career, Talmadge became embroiled in a financial scandal. After an extensive investigation by the Senate, on October 11, 1979, the U.S. Senate voted 81–15 to "denounce" Talmadge for "improper financial conduct" between 1973 and 1978. He was found to have accepted reimbursements of $43,435.83 for official expenses not incurred, and to have improperly reported the "expenses" as campaign expenditures.

After the trial, he faced significant opposition in the state's Democratic primary for the first time in 24 years. Lieutenant Governor Zell Miller challenged Talmadge in the primary with the support of liberals disenchanted with Talmadge's conservatism. Though he succeeded in winning the primary runoff against Miller, Talmadge's ethical conduct was a significant issue and he was defeated by the Republican candidate, former state GOP chairman Mack Mattingly. 
 It was also believed that the bruising primary battle with Miller left Talmadge weakened for the general election.

Divorce
Talmadge filed for divorce from his wife, Betty, in 1977 following a long period of personal troubles for Talmadge, including self-admitted alcoholism, which spiraled out of control after his son, Bobby, drowned in 1975.  The Talmadges eventually reached a divorce settlement in 1978, with Betty receiving $150,000 in cash and 100 acres of their Lovejoy plantation. She was also allowed to use the remaining 1,200 acres on the plantation. His wife testified against him in 1980 during the investigation into his finances, resulting in a denunciation from the U.S. Senate, which contributed to the end his long political career.

Later life
After his defeat, Talmadge retired to his home; his plantation and mansion were now in the hands of his ex-wife, Betty. In 1984, he married his third wife, Lynda Pierce, who was 26 years younger than himself. He lived on for more than two decades, dying at the age of 88. Talmadge and his second wife, Betty, who eventually reconciled and remained on respectful terms after the divorce, had had two sons together, Herman E. Talmadge, Jr. (died 2014), and Robert Shingler Talmadge (died 1975). Betty Talmadge died in 2005, surrounded by family, on her estate. At the time of his death, Herman Talmadge was the earliest serving former governor.

Awards
 1969, he was awarded an honorary degree in Doctor of Laws from Oglethorpe University.
1975, Morris Brown College gave Talmadge its "Man of the Year" award.

See also

 Conservative Democrat
 List of United States senators expelled or censured
 List of members of the American Legion

References

External links
 New Georgia Encyclopedia Article 
Stuart A. Rose Manuscript, Archives, and Rare Books Library, Emory University: Betty Talmadge papers, 1932-1981

 Oral History Interviews with Herman Talmadge Herman Talmadge and Jack Nelson, conducted by Oral History Interview with Herman Talmadge, July 15 and 24, 1975. Interview A-0331-1. Southern Oral History Program Collection (#4007)., Herman Talmadge and Jack Nelson, conducted by Oral History Interview with Herman Talmadge, July 29 and August 1, 1975. Interview A-0331-2. Southern Oral History Program Collection (#4007)., Herman Talmadge and Jack Nelson, conducted by Oral History Interview with Herman Talmadge, December 18, 1975. Interview A-0331-3. Southern Oral History Program Collection (#4007)., Herman Talmadge and John Egerton, conducted by Oral History Interview with Herman Talmadge, November 8, 1990. Interview A-0347. Southern Oral History Program Collection (#4007). from Oral Histories of the American South Oral History Interviews, 1985-1995. Georgia's Political Heritage Program, (University of West Georgia. Carrollton, Ga.
 
 Talmadge Plaza historical marker

|-

|-

|-

|-

|-

1913 births
2002 deaths
1956 United States vice-presidential candidates
American segregationists
Censured or reprimanded United States senators
Democratic Party governors of Georgia (U.S. state)
Democratic Party United States senators from Georgia (U.S. state)
Georgia (U.S. state) Dixiecrats
People from McRae, Georgia
United States Navy officers
United States Navy personnel of World War II
University of Georgia alumni
Watergate scandal investigators